Dramatic School is a 1938 American romantic drama film directed by Robert B. Sinclair and starring Luise Rainer, Paulette Goddard, Alan Marshal, Lana Turner, and Gale Sondergaard. Based on the play School of Drama by Hans Székely and Zoltan Egyed, the screenplay was written by Ernest Vajda and Mary C. McCall. The film was produced and distributed by Metro-Goldwyn-Mayer.

Plot
Modest, kind-hearted aspiring actress Louise Mauban (Luise Rainer) attends the Paris School of Drama while working nights at a dreary factory job, where she has made friends with another worker. She often comes to class late but rather than admit she has to work nights, she tells her fellow students stories of a luxurious life and her wealthy, handsome boyfriend, Marquis Andre D'Abbencourt (Alan Marshal). The other girls begin to suspect that her stories are just fantasies that she weaves to relieve her humdrum life. One of them, Nana (Paulette Goddard), maliciously invites Louise to her "birthday party", having arranged for Andre to attend. However, the plan backfires. Andre is enchanted by Louise and the lie turns into the truth. He showers her with gifts and takes her out every night.

Andre eventually becomes enamored of another woman and breaks up with Louise by letter. When Louise's friends show up, she tells them to take their pick of the fabulous clothes Andre has given her. However, to a late-arriving Nana, she shows the letter, as her "gift". Nana's heart is softened to her rival and they become friends.

One of the teachers is impressed by Louise's sincerity and talent, but another teacher and aging star,  Madame Therese Charlot (Gale Sondergaard), is jealous of Louise. Madame Therese is upset to learn from the school's director, Monsieur Pasquel, Sr. (Henry Stephenson) that she will not get the leading role in a new play about Joan of Arc because she is no longer young enough. In her bitterness, she lashes out when Louise is late to class once again; she informs Louise that she will demand her expulsion. Louise follows her and, to Charlot's surprise, thanks her. Louise explains that she believes that to be a great star, she must suffer, as Madame Charlot herself had suffered early in her own career.

The next day, Louise defiantly returns to class. Madame Charlot announces that she has accepted another, more mature role in the play and recommended Louise for the lead. Louise gets the part and is a great success on opening night, receiving a standing ovation. On the night of her triumph, she turns down party invitations, including one from Andre, to celebrate with her friend from the factory.

Cast

 Luise Rainer as Louise Mauban
 Paulette Goddard as Nana
 Alan Marshal as Marquis Andre D'Abbencourt
 Lana Turner as Mado
 Genevieve Tobin as Gina Bertier
 John Hubbard as Fleury (as Anthony Allan)
 Henry Stephenson as Pasquel, Sr.
 Gale Sondergaard as Madame Therese Charlot
 Melville Cooper as Boulin
 Erik Rhodes as Georges Mounier
 Virginia Grey as Simone
 Ann Rutherford as Yvonne
 Margaret Dumont as the Pantomime Teacher
 Hans Conried as Ramy
 Marie Blake as Annette
 Rand Brooks as Pasquel Jr.
 Arthur Gardner as Student (Uncredited)
 Ralph Faulkner as Fencing Teacher (Uncredited)

Box office
According to MGM records the film earned $433,000 in the US and Canada and $231,000 elsewhere resulting in a loss of $206,000.

References
Notes

Citations

External links

 Dramatic School at the Internet Movie Database
 

1938 films
American black-and-white films
Films scored by Franz Waxman
American films based on plays
Metro-Goldwyn-Mayer films
Films about actors
1938 romantic drama films
American romantic drama films
Films directed by Robert B. Sinclair
Works about performing arts education
1930s English-language films
1930s American films